Saint-Martin-de-Caralp (Languedocien: Sent Martin de Caralp) is a commune in the Ariège department in southwestern France.

Population
Inhabitants of Saint-Martin-de-Caralp are called Saint-Martinois.

See also
Communes of the Ariège department

References

Communes of Ariège (department)
Ariège communes articles needing translation from French Wikipedia